Glumche is a village in Karnobat Municipality, in Burgas Province, in southeastern Bulgaria.

Honours
Glumche Island in Antarctica is named after the village of Glumche.

References

Villages in Karnobat Municipality